Trương Thanh Hằng (born 1 May 1986 in Ho Chi Minh City) is a Vietnamese track and field athlete who specialises in middle-distance running events. She is the Vietnamese record holder over both 800 metres and 1500 metres.

She is one of Asia's foremost middle-distance runners, having been Asian champion over 800 m both indoors and outdoors. She was a double silver medallist for Vietnam at the 2010 Asian Games. She has also been highly successful at the Southeast Asian Games, where she has won gold medals on five occasions from 2005 to 2009.

Career
Born in Ho Chi Minh City, Thanh Hang won a national title over 1500 metres in 2004 and began to represent her country internationally the following year, beginning with a sixth-place finish at the 2005 Asian Athletics Championships. She won the 1500 m gold medal at the 2005 Southeast Asian Games, breaking the Games record and Vietnamese national record, and she also claimed the bronze medal in the women's 800 metres. Her next major competition was the 2006 Asian Games and she was knocked out in the qualifying rounds of the 800 m, but took fourth in her 1500 m speciality, improving her national mark to 4:17.66 minutes in the process.

At the 2007 Asian Athletics Championships Thanh Hang won the 800 m gold but was third in the 1500 m, behind Sinimole Paulose and Sara Bekheet. Further success came at the regional 2007 Southeast Asian Games, as she completed an 800/1500 m double with national record runs of 2:02.39 and 4:11.60 minutes. She attended no major events in 2008 but won a series of medals in late 2009. She won two bronze medals at the 2009 Asian Athletics Championships and gained an 800 m silver and 1500 m bronze at the 2009 Asian Indoor Games, setting national indoor records at both distances. She retained her titles at the 2009 Southeast Asian Games the following month, while her male compatriot Nguyen Dinh Cuong made it a middle-distance sweep for Vietnam.

She began her 2010 season at the 2010 Asian Indoor Athletics Championships in Tehran and was a comfortable winner of the 800 m. The 2010 Asian Games saw her career reach new heights as she knocked nearly five seconds off her 1500 m best to take the silver in a time of 4:09.58 minutes, beaten only by Maryam Yusuf Jamal the reigning world champion. Similar improvements came in the 800 m, where her new national record mark of 2:00.91 minutes brought another silver medal. She was one of only three athletics medallists for Vietnam at the 2010 Asian Games, the others being Vu Van Huyen and Vu Thi Huong.

At age of 25, Truong Thanh Hang has 5 gold medals from SEA Games, with the addition of three golds from the Asian championships. On that basis, the 2011 Southeast Asia Games was probably to serve only as a “cool down” to wrap up her busy season, before starting the build-up for the London Olympics. Thanh Hang delivered two gold medals as expected in both 800m and 1500m, clocking 2:02.65 and 4:15.75 respectively. The good times achieved following a closer battle from teammate Do Thi Thao who finished in second in both 800m (2:05.62) and 1500m (4:18.94). At the recent Asian championships she claimed the gold medal at 800m with 2:01.41, winning the silver in the 1500m (4:18.40).

References

External links

Living people
1986 births
Sportspeople from Ho Chi Minh City
Vietnamese female middle-distance runners
Asian Games medalists in athletics (track and field)
Athletes (track and field) at the 2006 Asian Games
Athletes (track and field) at the 2010 Asian Games
World Athletics Championships athletes for Vietnam
Asian Games silver medalists for Vietnam
Medalists at the 2010 Asian Games
Southeast Asian Games medalists in athletics
Southeast Asian Games gold medalists for Vietnam
Southeast Asian Games bronze medalists for Vietnam
Competitors at the 2005 Southeast Asian Games
Competitors at the 2007 Southeast Asian Games
Competitors at the 2009 Southeast Asian Games
Competitors at the 2011 Southeast Asian Games
21st-century Vietnamese women
20th-century Vietnamese women